Wilhelm Gause (27 March 1853 – 13 June 1916) was a German-Austrian painter. He studied at the Düsseldorf Academy, and in 1888 exhibited his work in Vienna.

Works
Perhaps Gause's most famous work is Court Ball at the Hofburg. Created in 1900, it hangs today within the walls of the Wien Museum Karlsplatz, Vienna, Austria. It depicts aristocrats crowding around Franz Joseph I of Austria at the Hofburg Imperial Palace.

On 28 January 2011, Another painting of his, Party on the Ice, 1909 was sold at Sotheby's in New York for $13,750.

References

External links 

1853 births
1916 deaths
19th-century German painters
19th-century German male artists
German male painters
20th-century German painters
20th-century German male artists